Kopli (Estonian for "Paddock") is a subdistrict of the district of Põhja-Tallinn (Northern Tallinn) in Tallinn, the capital of Estonia. It is located on the Kopli Peninsula and is bordered by parts of the Tallinn Bay, the Kopli Bay to the southwest and the Paljassaare Bay to the north. Kopli has a population of 7,240. Kopli's former German name until 1918 was Ziegelskoppel.

Bekker Port, which was erected for the Bekker Shipbuilding Yard in 1912–1913, is located in the area. In 1912 a Russo-Baltic Shipbuilding Yard, which is now BLRT Grupp, was also set up in the area. There is also Port of Meeruse.

Estonian Maritime Academy is located in Kopli.

Cemetery
Kopli was the former location of the largest Lutheran Baltic German cemetery in Tallinn, known as Kopli cemetery (in Estonian: Kopli kalmistu; in ) which was founded around 1774. The cemetery was flattened and destroyed over a 170 years later around 1950–1951, during the second occupation of the Baltic states, by the Soviet authorities who used the area of Kopli as a base for the Soviet Armed Forces. The former cemetery is now a public park.

Shipyards

The Russo-Baltic Shipyard (Estonian: Vene-Balti laevaehitustehas) was a shipyard located on the Kopli peninsula. The project covered a large territory and fully changed the region's appearance. It is one of the largest complexes in Estonia that was planned as a whole. The region was completed mainly between 1912 and 1915. 

After the Russian-Japanese War the Russian Empire needed a new shipyard and everything that came with it: a harbour, a sea fortress, a ship factory. In 1911 it was decided that the new navy base would be in Tallinn and so three shipyards were built: Noblessner, Bekker and the Russo-Baltic shipyard. The shipyard, that opened on May 31, 1913, was at first called “Russian-Baltic Shipbuilding and Mechanics Ltd”. The project was realized with technical and financial assistance of foreign capital from the French-Belgian company Schneider-Creusot. The project covered a large territory and fully changed the region's appearance.

Most of the buildings and constructions were designed according to the plans of the Russian architect Aleksandr Dmitriyev. Originally, the complex had everything a person could need, including homes, a hospital, a diner, a church, a school, a cinema, a bakery, a post office, even a tramm was put up to work. An orthodox church was built as well, since most of the workers were of Russian origin. It was planned so that a worker could go an entire life without leaving factory grounds. The region had its own power plant that was eight times more powerful than Tallinn's power plant.

The newly formed region could provide accommodation up to 1000 workers at the beginning, while just a few years later the numbers could vary between 7000 and 10000 workers in 1917. The living quarters were built hierarchically. The manual laborers lived on the northern side of the peninsula, later called the Kopli lines (Estonian: Kopli liinid), having accommodation in barracks. The most commonly built barrack had two stories and a corridor-based interior with rooms or apartments on both sides. Each house had running water and electricity. All houses were wooden, some of them had a brick hallway, those were planned for families, but more skilled workers moved in them instead. Two long barracks were planned for young workers without families.

The Directors’, Engineers’ and Officers’ quarters, later called the “Professors’ Village” (Estonian: Professorite küla) was located on the southern side of the peninsula, on Süsta, Ketta and Kaluri streets. Those houses were different from the common workers’ houses, being highly comfortable and fancier. Although each house has a unique look, all of them are wooden with a brick hallway, which is usually covered with wood. All of the buildings have a garden, the Director's and Deputy Director's houses (Kaluri 15 and 13) used to have park-like gardens reaching up to the sea.

After World War I, shipbuilding decreased. In 1917, the factory was evacuated. After the war, the empty barracks were used as hospitals. Later, the newly independent Estonian government tried to reestablish the factory but without luck. The machinery was sold and former soldiers came to live here.

Kopli Kinnisvaravalitsus (English: Kopli Real Estate Administration), later renamed Kopli Kinnisvarad (English: Kopli Real Estate) was formed to manage and fix the housing. 1930s are considered Kopli's peak. The factory grounds were put in use again and the Tallinn University of Technology moved to the main building. That is when the name Professors village came into use, since many professors moved there.

After the war, many of the buildings were in ruins. The new administration formed a new shipyard, where repair work was done, later called Balti Laevaremondi Tehas (English: Baltic Ship Repair Factory). New factory buildings were built. However, the university still remained in the main building. Around the same time, the streets were given names for the first time. However, the worker's part was numbered and called lines. In addition, the new factory's workers were no longer housed there, so after the 1960s, the region suffered a rapid downfall. The houses were poorly maintained and inhabited by drunkards, former convicts and others experiencing troubles. The Soviet government had plans of demolishing the worker's part since the 1970s. However, because of the uncertainty, there were problems with the ownership and it never came to it.

After Estonia regained its independence, the factory became one of the most important enterprises of the country and even now, approximatively 1000 people work in the production lines every day. The work space varies from the original buildings of the Tsarist period to the buildings from the Soviet time. The Estonian Maritime Academy moved into the main building of the factory at the beginning of the XXI-st Century, thus taking good care of the building. The fate of the former workers' houses was more dramatic: in the early 2000s, the houses were inhabited by homeless people and often caught on fire. After a while, the State Administration decided to privatize the wooden houses in order to either restore or demolish them, and in the end decided to look for a foreign investor to rehabilitate the constructions, in order to improve the region's reputation. For years, the region waited for a developer, up until the year 2015, when Fund Ehitus started developing a new settlement in the Kopli lines. Today, many of the historical houses have been reconstructed and new houses, designed by Kino Maastikuarhitektid, Apex and Peeter Pere architects have been built, but many are still waiting to be built.

Gallery

References

External links

Image of a historical map from the year 1881 showing the cemetery and the whole Kopli peninsula

Subdistricts of Tallinn
Peninsulas of Estonia